Flodaigh is a small island in Loch Roag on the west coast of Lewis in the Outer Hebrides of Scotland. Its name derives from the Old Norse for "flat island".

Inland, the nearest settlement is opposite the hamlet of Cairisiadar. The island was last inhabited in 1827 when it was cleared to make way for a sheep farm.

The small islet of Gousam lies to the north east and the larger islands of Fuaigh Beag and Fuaigh Mòr further east.

Notes

Islands of Loch Ròg
Cleared places in the Outer Hebrides
Former populated places in Scotland
Uninhabited islands of the Outer Hebrides